Union Station  is a provincial electoral district (riding) in the Canadian province of Manitoba that was first contested at the 2019 Manitoba general election. Uzoma Asagwara of the New Democratic Party was elected its first representative to the Legislative Assembly of Manitoba.

History 
The riding was created by the 2018 provincial redistribution out of parts of Logan, Wolseley and Minto. The riding is presumably named for Union Station and according to the boundaries commission "to recognize the important role of the railway in the establishment of Winnipeg".

Location 
The riding contains most of Downtown Winnipeg and parts of the neighbourhoods of West Broadway and Spence.

Election results

References

Manitoba provincial electoral districts
Politics of Winnipeg
West End, Winnipeg